Taber-Warner is a provincial electoral district in Alberta, Canada. The district has existed twice: the first iteration was represented in the Assembly from 1963 until 1997, and the district will be contested again in the next Alberta general election.

History

Boundary history
The district was created in 1963 from Taber and Warner, although not including the section of Taber to the north of the Old Man River. Its boundaries saw minor adjustments over the years, but always contained the communities of Taber, Warner, and Coaldale, stretching east from the City of Lethbridge and south to the Montana border.

The district became a flashpoint of controversy in 1994, when the Alberta Court of Appeal heavily criticized the new map of electoral boundaries drawn up by a committee of PC MLAs led by Bob Bogle. The Court noted that “one of the smallest divisions in the province...was that for which [Bogle] was then the sitting member.” A new system for appointing boundaries commissions was introduced in 1995, and Taber-Warner was subsequently abolished. Most of its territory was transferred to Cardston-Taber-Warner in 1997, with the Coaldale area transferred to Little Bow.

The second iteration of the district took sections of Cardston-Taber-Warner, Little Bow and Cypress-Medicine Hat. It is significantly larger in area than the first, now stretching east to the border of Cypress County, but still entirely south of the Old Man and South Saskatchewan rivers.

Representation history

Taber-Warner's first representative was the incumbent Warner MLA and Social Credit Minister for Public Welfare Leonard Halmrast, who had already served five terms in the Legislature. As no other candidates stood against him in the 1963 election, Taber-Warner holds the distinction of being the last  district to elect an MLA by acclamation in Alberta. Halmrast retired at the end of that term.

Social Credit easily kept the seat in 1967, with Douglas Miller becoming MLA. In 1971, the party lost the general election to Peter Lougheed's Progressive Conservatives (PCs), but Miller was able to hang on to Taber-Warner by a small margin. He retired from politics in 1975.

The 1975 election in Taber-Warner was hotly contested, with second-time PC candidate Robert Bogle facing Social Credit leader and future Reform MP Werner Schmidt. Bogle defeated Schmidt by a wide margin, cementing the demise of Social Credit as a force in Alberta politics. He would go on to serve five terms as MLA, holding the position of Minister of Utilities and Telecommunications between 1982 and 1986, and briefly of PC caucus chair and Whip before his retirement from politics in 1993.

The district's last representative was Ron Hierath, who was elected comfortably in 1993 despite the Liberals' best showing in the otherwise conservative district. The riding was merged into Cardston-Taber-Warner in 1997, and Hierath would serve one more term as its first MLA.

Election results

1960s

|-
||
|colspan=4|Social Credit hold

1970s

1980s

1990s

2010s

References

Alberta provincial electoral districts